Arctostaphylos uva-ursi is a plant species of the genus Arctostaphylos widely distributed across circumboreal regions of the subarctic Northern Hemisphere. Kinnikinnick (from the Unami for "smoking mixture") is a common name in Canada and the United States. The flowers are white to pink and the fruit is a red berry.

One of several related species referred to as bearberry, its specific epithet uva-ursi means "grape of the bear" in Latin, similar to the meaning of the generic epithet Arctostaphylos (Greek for "bear grapes").

Description
Erect branching twigs emerge from long flexible prostrate stems, which are produced by single roots. The trailing stems will layer, sending out small roots periodically. The finely textured velvety branches are initially white to pale green, becoming smooth and red-brown with maturity. The small solitary three-scaled buds are dark brown.

Their tops are darker green than their undersides. They have rounded tips tapering back to the base, held vertically by a twisted leaf stalk in an alternate arrangement on the stem. The leaves remain green for 1–3 years before falling in autumn, when their colour changes to a reddish-green or purple, pale on the underside.

Terminal clusters of small urn-shaped flowers bloom from May to June. The flowers are white to pink, and bear round, fleshy or mealy, bright red to pink fruits called drupes. The red fruits persist on the plant into early winter. The fruits are bittersweet when raw, but sweeter when boiled and dried. Each drupe contains 1 to 5 hard seeds, which need to be scarified and stratified prior to germination to reduce the seed coat and break embryo dormancy. There is an average of 40,900 cleaned seeds per pound.

Chemistry
The plant contains diverse phytochemicals, including ursolic acid, tannic acid, gallic acid, some essential oils and resin, hydroquinones (mainly arbutin, up to 17%), tannins (up to 15%), phenolic glycosides and flavonoids.

Subspecies 
There are some 14 subspecies, including:
 Arctostaphylos uva-ursi subsp. uva-ursi. Common bearberry; circumpolar arctic and subarctic, and in mountains further south.
 Arctostaphylos uva-ursi subsp. adenotricha. Central high Sierra Nevada.
 Arctostaphylos uva-ursi subsp. coactilis. North coastal California, central coast California, San Francisco Bay Area.
 Arctostaphylos uva-ursi subsp. cratericola . Guatemala bearberry, endemic to Guatemala at very high altitudes. 
 Arctostaphylos uva-ursi subsp. longifoliosa. Various reports from Canada, U.S.A. May be the same as adenotricha or coactilis.

For a list of reported North American subspecies and varietals, see USDA Plants Profile.

Etymology 
The genus name of Arctostaphylos uva-ursi comes from the Greek words arctos (meaning bear) and staphyle (meaning "bunch of grapes") in reference to the fruits which form grape-like clusters. In the wild, the fruits are commonly eaten by bears. The specific epithet, uva-ursi, comes from the Latin words uva (meaning grape) and ursus (bear), reflected by the bearberry nickname.

The common name, kinnikinnick, is an Algonquin word meaning "smoking mixture". Native Americans and early pioneers smoked the dried uva-ursi leaves and bark alone or mixed with other herbs, tobacco or dried dogwood bark in pipes. Numerous common names exist, depending on region, such as mealberry, sandberry, mountain-box, fox-plum, hog-crawberry, and barren myrtle.

Distribution and habitat 
The distribution of Arctostaphylos uva-ursi is circumpolar, and it is widespread in northern latitudes, but confined to high altitudes further south: 
 in Europe, from Iceland and North Cape, Norway south to southern Spain (Sierra Nevada); central Italy (Apennines) and northern Greece (Pindus mountains);
 in Asia from arctic Siberia south to Turkey, the Caucasus, the Levant and the Himalaya;
 in North America from arctic Alaska, Canada and Greenland, south to California, north coast, central High Sierra Nevada (above Convict Lake, Mono County, California), Central Coast, California, San Francisco Bay Area, to New Mexico in the Rocky Mountains; and the Appalachian Mountains in the northeast United States. It is prevalent across all regions of British Columbia and Alberta.

Ecology 
It is a fire-tolerant species and may be a seedbanking species.

Arctostaphylos uva-ursi is an alternate host for spruce broom rust.

Bears and other animals eat the berries.

Conservation
The plant is rare or endangered in several states of the Midwestern United States.

Toxicity
One review indicated that ingestion of large doses can cause allergic reactions, with nausea and seizures, as a potential emergency condition. Preliminary studies indicate that arbutin may be toxic when ingested in high doses. Uva ursi may cause adverse effects in people with liver or kidney disease, or pregnant and breastfeeding women.

The leaves contain arbutin, which metabolizes to form hydroquinone, a potential liver toxin.

Uses
Bearberry fruits and leaves are used by members of the Blackfeet Nation as food. While edible raw the fruits are fairly bland that way, but can be used to make jelly. The berries were used as seasoning and cooked with meat. The young leaves can be made into tea.
Teas and extracts of the leaves have been used in traditional medicine of First Nations people over centuries as urinary tract antiseptics, diuretics, and laxatives. In herbalism, leaf tea is used to treat urinary tract inflammation. Though thought to be an astringent or cure for sexually transmitted diseases, as of 2017, there was no high-quality evidence from clinical research that such treatments are effective or safe.

Dried bearberry leaves are the main component in many traditional North American Native smoking mixes, known collectively as "kinnikinnick" (Algonquin for "smoking mixture") used especially among western First Nations, often including other herbs and sometimes tobacco.

Native Americans also used the plant to make yellow dye.

There are several cultivars that are propagated for use as ornamental plants. It is an attractive year-round evergreen groundcover for gardens, and is useful for controlling erosion on hillsides and slopes due to its deep roots. It is tolerant of sun and dry soils, and is thus common groundcover in urban areas, in naturalized areas, and in native plant or rock gardens.

References

External links

 Medicinal Plants: Arctostaphylos uva-ursi

uva-ursi
Berries
Flora of Europe
Flora of Asia
Flora of North America
Natural history of the California chaparral and woodlands
Native American culture
Smoking in the United States
Garden plants of Asia
Garden plants of Europe
Garden plants of North America
Groundcovers
Medicinal plants
Plants used in Native American cuisine